Glenlomond is a village in Perth and Kinross, Scotland. It lies northeast of Loch Leven, north of the A911 road, at the foot of Bishop Hill in the Lomond Hills.

References

Villages in Perth and Kinross